Zichy is a surname. Notable people with the name include:

Mihály Zichy (1827–1906), Hungarian painter and graphic artist
Maria Anna Stubenberg Zichy (1821-1912), composer
Eleonóra Zichy  (1867–1945), Hungarian noblewoman
Géza Zichy (1849–1924), Hungarian composer
Melanie Metternich-Zichy (1832–1919), Austrian aristocrat
Theodore Zichy (1908-1987) - a British-Hungarian auto racer, actor, photographer, film director, producer and playboy

See also
Zichy family, is the name of a Magyar family of the Hungarian nobility
Zichy Land, is a geographical subgroup of Franz Josef Land, Arkhangelsk Oblast, Russia